Mongolia competed at the 2015 World Championships in Athletics in Beijing, China, from 22–30 August 2015.

Results
(q – qualified, NM – no mark, SB – season best)

Men
Track and road events

Women
Track and road events

Sources 

Nations at the 2015 World Championships in Athletics
World Championships in Athletics
Mongolia at the World Championships in Athletics